The primary purpose of a seismometer is to locate the initiating points of earthquake epicenters.  The secondary purpose, of determining the 'size' or Moment magnitude scale must be calculated after the precise location is known.

The earliest seismographs were designed to give a sense of the direction of the first motions from an earthquake.  The Chinese frog seismograph would have dropped its ball in the general compass direction of the earthquake, assuming a strong positive pulse.  We now know that first motions can be in almost any direction depending on the type of initiating rupture (focal mechanism).

The first refinement that allowed a more precise determination of the location, was the use of a time scale.  Instead of merely noting, or recording, the absolute motions of a pendulum, the displacements were plotted on a moving graph, driven by a clock mechanism.  This was the first seismogram, which allowed precise timing of the first ground motion, and an accurate plot of subsequent motions.

From the first seismograms, as seen on the figure, it was noticed that the trace was divided into two major portions.  The first seismic wave to arrive was the P-wave, followed closely by the S-wave.  Knowing the relative 'velocities of propagation', it was a simple matter to calculate the distance of the earthquake.

One seismograph would give the distance, but that could be plotted as a circle, with an infinite number of possibilities.  Two seismographs would give two intersecting circles, with two possible locations.  Only with a third seismograph would there be a precise location.

Modern earthquake location still requires a minimum of three seismometers.  Most likely, there are many, forming a seismic array.  The emphasis is on precision, since much can be learned about the fault mechanics and seismic hazard, if the locations can be determined to within a kilometer or two, for small earthquakes.  For this, computer programs use an iterative process, involving a 'guess and correction' algorithm. As well, a very good model of the local crustal velocity structure is required: seismic velocities vary with the local geology. For P-waves, the relation between velocity and bulk density of the medium has been quantified in Gardner's relation.

Notes

Seismology measurement